Siye may refer to the following people:

Siye Abraha (born 1955), Ethiopian politician
Li Siye (died 759), general of the Tang Dynasty